Mustafa Aydın is a Turkish academic (Professor of International Relations), writer, columnist, TV commentator, and public intellectual. He served as the Rector of Kadir Has University (İstanbul, Turkey) between 2010 and 2018; and currently is the President of the International Relations Council (UIK) of Turkey.

Education 
He was born in Trabzon on the Black Sea coast of Turkey on 15 September 1967, but grew up in Ankara. He graduated from the Department of International Relations, Faculty of Political Science of Ankara University in 1988. He did a master's degree in the field of International Relations and Strategic Studies in 1991 at Lancaster University, UK, and obtained his PhD “Political Sciences and International Relations” in 1994 from the same university.

Career 
Working as an academic member at the Faculty of Political Science of Ankara University between 1995 and 2005, Professor Aydın assumed the title of Associate Professor in 1999 and the Full Professor in 2005, and served as the founding-chair of the Program on “Global and Regional Studies”.

He later held positions as the Head of the Department of International Relations at the TOBB University of Economics and Technology between 2005 and 2010; Director of International Policy Research Institute (TEPAV-IPRI, Ankara) between 2005 and 2011; Co-Coordinator of the International Commission on the Black Sea; member of the Economy and Foreign Policy Study Group of the President's Office; Board Member of the strategic research centers of both the Turkish Ministry of Foreign Affairs and Turkish Armed Forces; Deputy Chairperson of the International Commission of Eminent Persons on the Caucasus and Caspian (2007-2008); Alexander S. Onassis Fellow at the University of Athens (2003); Research Fellow at the EU Institute for Security Studies, Paris (2003); Fulbright Scholar at the JFK School of Government, Harvard University (2002); and UNESCO Fellow at the Richardson Institute for Peace Studies, UK (1999).

Affiliations and memberships 
He is an elected member of European Academy of Sciences and Art; elected member of the Senate of the Euro-Mediterranean University; member of the Governing Council of the World Council for Middle Eastern Studies (WOCMES), OECD International Management of Higher Education Program, European Leadership Network, Global Relations Forum, and International Studies Association.

Editing and writing 
He is the owner and editor-in-chief of the Journal of International Relations (Uluslararası İlişkiler in Turkish), and writes weekly columns for the Hürriyet Daily News.

Works

Prof. Aydın's areas of interest are International Politics, Foreign Policy Analysis, security issues related to Central Asia, Caucasus, the Black Sea and the Middle East, as well as Turkish foreign and security policies. Some of his works includes:
 The Levant: Search for a Regional Order (2018) 
 Special Issue on Turkish Foreign Policy, Uluslararasi Iliskiler (International Relations), 2016
 A 2020 Vision for the Black Sea Region (With Dimitrios Triantaphyllou)
 Non-Traditional Security Threats and Regional Cooperation in the Southern Caucasus (ed. 2011)
 Central Asia in Global Politics (in Turkish, 2004)
 Europe’s Next Shore; Black Sea After the Enlargement (2004)
 Turkish Foreign Policy; Framework and Analysis (2005)
 International Security Today; Understanding Change and Debating Security (ed. with K. Ifantis, 2006)
 Turkish Foreign and Security Policy (ed. 2006)
 Regional In/security: Redefining Threats and Responses (ed. 2007)
 Turkey’s Eurasian Adventure (in Turkish, 2008)

His latest articles include:
 "Levantine Challenges on Turkish Foreign Policy" (with Cihan Dizdaroglu)
 "Türkiye’de Uluslararası İlişkiler Akademisyenleri ve Alana Yönelik Yaklaşımları Üzerine Bir İnceleme: TRIP 2014 Sonuçları (Fulya Hisarlıoğlu ve Korhan Yazgan ile birlikte)

References

Academic staff of Ankara University
Academic staff of Kadir Has University
Living people
1967 births
Rectors of universities and colleges in Turkey